The 2023 Chennai Open Challenger was a professional tennis tournament played on hard courts. It was the third edition of the tournament which was part of the 2023 ATP Challenger Tour. It took place in Chennai, India between 13 and 19 February 2023.

Singles main-draw entrants

Seeds

 1 Rankings are as of 6 February 2023.

Other entrants
The following players received wildcards into the singles main draw:
  Leo Borg
  Prajnesh Gunneswaran
  Ramkumar Ramanathan

The following player received entry into the singles main draw using a protected ranking:
  Marc Polmans

The following players received entry from the qualifying draw:
  Alibek Kachmazov
  James McCabe
  Sumit Nagal
  Petr Nouza
  Carlos Sánchez Jover
  Mukund Sasikumar

The following player received entry as a lucky loser:
  Jason Jung

Champions

Singles

 Max Purcell def.  Nicolas Moreno de Alboran 5–7, 7–6(7–2), 6–4.

Doubles

 Jay Clarke /  Arjun Kadhe def.  Sebastian Ofner /  Nino Serdarušić 6–0, 6–4.

References

2023 ATP Challenger Tour
February 2023 sports events in India
2023 in Indian sport